Below is a list of notable members of Zeta Phi Beta Sorority (commonly referred to as Zetas). Zeta Phi Beta was founded on January 16, 1920, on the campus of Howard University in Washington, D.C. The sorority was incorporated in Washington, D.C. on March 30, 1923. In 1939, the sorority was incorporated in Illinois.



Founders and Incorporators

National Presidents
Arizona Cleaver Stemons (1920)
Myrtle Tyler Faithful (1921–1922)
Joanna Houston Ransom (1922–1923)
Nellie A. Buchanan (1923–1925)
Dr. S. Evelyn Lewis (1925–1926)
Ruth Tappe Scruggs (1926–1930)
Fannie R. Givens (1930–1933)
Violette Neatley Anderson (1933–1937)
Nellie B. Rogers (1937–1939)
Edith Lyons (1939–1940)
Blanche Thompson (1940–1943)
Lullelia W. Harrison (1943–1948)
Nancy B. Woolridge McGhee (1948–1953)
Deborah Cannon P. Wolfe (1953–1965)
Mildred Carter Bradham (1965–1970)
Isabel M. Herson (1970–1974)
Janice G. Kissner (1974–1980)
Edith V. Francis (1980–1986)
Eunice S. Thomas (1986–1992)
Jylla Moore Foster Tearte (1992–1996)
Barbara West Carpenter (1996–2002)
Barbara C. Moore (2002–2008)
Sheryl P. Underwood (2008–2012)
Mary Breaux Wright (2012–2018)
Valerie Hollingsworth Baker (2018–2022)

Civil rights

Education

Science and health

Authors and artists

Entertainers

Athletes

Politicians

Community leaders

Television, radio, and media

References

sisters
Lists of members of United States student societies